Sylvia Nanyonga (born 21 October 1984) is an Ugandan netball player who represents Uganda internationally and plays in the position of wing defense. She made her debut World Cup appearance for Uganda during the 2019 Netball World Cup.

References 

1990 births
Living people
Ugandan netball players
2019 Netball World Cup players
20th-century Ugandan women
21st-century Ugandan women